The glossy antshrike (Sakesphorus luctuosus) is a species of bird in the family Thamnophilidae, the antbirds.
The range includes the island at the river's mouth, Marajó Island.

Its natural habitats are subtropical or tropical moist lowland forests and subtropical or tropical swamps.

References

External links 
 Glossy antshrike photo gallery VIREO Phote-High Res

glossy antshrike
Birds of the Brazilian Amazon
Birds of Brazil
Endemic birds of Brazil
glossy antshrike
Taxonomy articles created by Polbot